Mark Casey (born 30 January 1982) is an international Australian lawn and indoor bowler.

Bowls career
In 2005 he won the gold medal at the inaugural World Cup Singles in Hong Kong.

The following year in 2006 he won the gold medal in the triples competition at the 2006 Commonwealth Games in Melbourne.
He won another the lawn bowls gold medal in the fours competition at the 2012 World Outdoor Bowls Championship.

He won seven medals at the Asia Pacific Bowls Championships, of which three have been gold medals.

In 2016 he was part of the triples team with Aron Sherriff and Barrie Lester who won the silver medal at the 2016 World Outdoor Bowls Championship in Christchurch and won another silver medal in the fours.

References

External links
 
 
 

1982 births
Living people
Australian male bowls players
Place of birth missing (living people)
Bowls World Champions
Commonwealth Games medallists in lawn bowls
Commonwealth Games gold medallists for Australia
Commonwealth Games silver medallists for Australia
Bowls players at the 2006 Commonwealth Games
Bowls players at the 2010 Commonwealth Games
21st-century Australian people
Medallists at the 2006 Commonwealth Games
Medallists at the 2010 Commonwealth Games